Clayholes is a small hamlet in Angus, Scotland.

The settlement is not present on the earliest detailed maps available for the area, but can be seen for example on Ainslie's map of 1794. The site, however, appears to have been settled in pre-modern times, as evidenced by archaeology found in the immediate vicinity.

References

See also
 Carnoustie

Villages in Angus, Scotland